Duarte is an Iberian given name and surname, being an alternative Portuguese form of the name Edward (another version is Eduardo).

Name 
 Duarte Coelho Pereira (c. 1485–1554), nobleman, military leader, and colonial administrator in the Portuguese colony of Brazil
 Duarte de Menezes (1488-1539),  Portuguese nobleman and colonial officer
 Duarte de Menezes, 3rd Count of Viana (1414-1464), Portuguese nobleman and military figure
 Duarte Brandão (1440-1508), the Governor of Guernsey, a knight, adventurer, ship commander and the godson and protégé of King Edward IV of England
 Duarte Nuno, Duke of Braganza (1907–1976), former claimant to the Portuguese throne
 Duarte Pio, Duke of Braganza (born 1945), current claimant to the Portuguese throne, Duarte Nuno's eldest son
 Duarte, Duke of Guimarães (1515–1540), the sixth son of King Manuel I of Portugal and his wife Maria of Aragon
 Duarte, Duke of Guimarães (1541–1576),  son of Duarte of Portugal, 4th Duke of Guimarães and his wife, Isabel of Braganza
 Duarte Fernandes (16th century), Portuguese diplomat, explorer, and was the first European to establish diplomatic relations with Thailand,
 Duarte I, 4th Duke of Guimarães (1515–1540), Infante of Portugal
 Duarte II, 5th Duke of Guimarães (1541–1576), Infante of Portugal
 Edward, Duke of Guimarães (disambiguation), several people
 Edward of Portugal (Portuguese Duarte I), King of Portugal, 1433–1438
 Duarte Cordeiro (born 1979), Portuguese economist and politician

Surname 
 Abílio Augusto Monteiro Duarte (1931–1996), Cape Verdean nationalist and early political leader in the independence era
 Adriano Belmiro Duarte Nicolau, best known for his nickname Yano, Angolan footballer
 Adriano Duarte Mansur da Silva (born 1980), known as Adriano Duarte, Brazilian football defender
 Ana Clara Reis Duarte (born 1989), Brazilian tennis player
 Andrés Duarte Villamayor (born 1972), Paraguayan footballer
 Anselmo Duarte (1920–2009), Brazilian actor, screenwriter and film director
 António Dinis Duarte (born 1967), Cape Verdean former footballer
 Arsénio Trindade Duarte (1925–1986), simply known as Arsénio, Portuguese footballer
 Arthur Duarte (1895–1982), Portuguese actor, screenwriter, production designer and film director
 Bela Duarte, artist from Cape Verde
 Belfort Duarte (1883–1918), Brazilian football central defender
 Bruno Duarte da Silva (born  1996), known as Bruno Duarte or simply Bruno, Brazilian footballer
 Carlos Duarte (footballer) (born 1933), Portuguese footballer
 Carlos Duarte, Venezuelan composer and pianist
 Carlos Duarte Costa (1888–1961), Brazilian Catholic bishop
 Carolina Duarte (born 1990), track and field athlete from Portugal
 Celso Duarte (born 1974), Paraguayan harp and Mexican jarocho harp, arranger and singer
 César Horacio Duarte Jáquez (born 1963), Mexican politician, member of the Institutional Revolutionary Party
 César Gonçalves de Brito Duarte (born 1964), known as Brito, Portuguese footballer
 Chris Duarte (basketball) (born 1997), Canadian basketball player
 Chris Duarte (musician) (born 1963), American guitarist, singer, and songwriter
 Cláudio Duarte (born 1950), Brazilian footballer and coach
 Daniel Duarte (disambiguation), several people
 David de Duarte Macedo (born 1995), Brazilian professional footballer
 Débora Duarte (born 1950), Brazilian actress
 Dénis Paulo Duarte (born 1994), Portuguese footballer
 Deroy Duarte (born 1999), Dutch football player
 Domingos Duarte (born 1995), Portuguese professional footballer
 Duarte Jorge Gomes Duarte (born 1987), also known as Duarte Duarte, Portuguese professional footballer
 Duarte de Freitas do Amaral, GCIH, ComC KCSG (1909–1979), Portuguese politician
 Elvira Lacy Duarte Cardoso (1937–2015), Uruguayan visual artist
 Enrique Duarte (born 1938), Peruvian basketball player
 Eugenio Duarte, Cape Verdean ordained minister and 37th General Superintendent in the Church of the Nazarene
 Eva Duarte de Perón (1919-1952),  the wife of Argentine President Juan Perón (1895–1974) and First Lady of Argentina from 1946 until her death in 1952
 F. J. Duarte (born c. 1954), American laser physicist
 Fábio Alexandre Duarte Felício (born 1982), Portuguese former footballer
 Fábio Miguel Silva Duarte (born 1998), Portuguese professional footballer
 Fabio Andrés Duarte Arevalo (born 1986), Colombian track and road cyclist
 Félix Ramos y Duarte (1848–1924), Cuban educator and writer
 Frederico Duarte (born 1999), Portuguese professional footballer
 Francisca Duarte (1595–1640), Portuguese singer
 Francisco Ayala y García-Duarte (1906-2009), Spanish writer, the last representative of the Generation of '27
 Francisco Lisvaldo Daniel Duarte (born 1990), also known as Esquerdinha, Brazilian footballer
 Francisco Miguel Duarte, also known as Chico Sapateiro (1907–1988), Portuguese writer and a regional leader
 Gabriela Duarte Franco (born 1974), Brazilian actress
 Gilles Duarte (born 1972), French rapper and actor
 Gisela Duarte Casas (born 1977), Peruvian volleyball player
 Gonçalo Duarte Amaral Sousa (born 1998), Portuguese professional footballer
 Henry Duarte Molina (born 1958), Costa Rican football coach
 Hugo Duarte Sousa Luz (born 1982), Portuguese professional footballer
 Humberto Duarte Mauro (1897–1983), Brazilian film director
 Javier Duarte de Ochoa (born 1973), Mexican politician (affiliated with the Institutional Revolutionary Party)
 Jessica María Duarte Volweider (born 1992), Venezuelan model and beauty pageant titleholder
 Jessie Duarte, South African politician
 Jesús Gámez Duarte (born 1985), Spanish professional footballer
 João Alexandre Duarte Ferreira Fernandes (born 1979), known as Neca, Portuguese footballer
 João Cidade Duarte (1495-1550), also known as John of God, Portuguese soldier and Roman Catholic saint
 João Duarte Pereira (born 1990),  Portuguese professional footballer
 Joe Duarte (born 1983), American professional mixed martial artist
 John-Paul Duarte (born 1986), Gibraltarian footballer
 John William Duarte (1919–2004), British composer, guitarist and writer
 José Duarte (disambiguation), several people
 José Napoleón Duarte Fuentes (1925–1990), Salvadoran politician who served as President of El Salvador from 1984 to 1989
 Julián Duarte (born 1994), Mexican male volleyball player
 Juan Maldondo Duarte (born 1982), Brazilian footballer
 Juan Pablo Duarte, founding father of the Dominican Republic
 Júlio Duarte Langa (born 1927), Roman Catholic Church bishop
 Karen Emilia Castiblanco Duarte (born 1988), Colombian tennis player
 Kylie Duarte (born 1993), American pair skater
 Laros Duarte (born 1997), Dutch professional football player
 Lacy Duarte (1937–2015), Uruguayan artist
 Lerin Duarte (born 1990), Dutch professional footballer
 Leonardo Campos Duarte da Silva (born 1996), known as Léo Duarte, Brazilian professional footballer
 Leonel Duarte Plat (born 1987), Cuban footballer
 Leonora Duarte (1610 – 1678?), Flemish composer and musician
 Lima Duarte (born Ariclenes Venâncio Martins; 1930), Brazilian actor
 Luis Duarte (1941–2017), Peruvian basketball player
 Luiz Duarte da Rocha (born 1956), Brazilian playwright and director, and singer/songwrite
 Manuel Alegre Duarte (born 1936), Portuguese poet and politician
 Manuel Almeida Duarte (born 1945), Portuguese footballer
 Marcelo Nuno Duarte Rebelo de Sousa  ComSE, GCIH (born 1948), Portuguese politician, academic and journalist serving as the 20th President of Portugal, since 9 March 2016
 María Gloria Penayo de Duarte (née Solaeche, born 1962), the First Lady of Paraguay as the wife of Nicanor Duarte Frutos,  President of Paraguay from 2003–2008
 Mariana Duarte (born 1996), Brazilian female water polo player
 Marcos Rogério Oliveira Duarte, known as Marcos Rogério or Rogério (born 1985), Brazilian footballer
 Mario Lucio Duarte Costa (born 1980),  known as Aranha, Brazilian football goalkeeper
 Matias Duarte, Chilean computer interface designer for (Android), Vice President of Design at Google
 Mauricio Duarte Barajas (born 1992), Colombian professional footballer
 Nancy Duarte, American writer, speaker and CEO
 Néstor Duarte Carassa (born 1990), Peruvian footballer
 Nicanor Duarte Frutos, former President of Paraguay, 2003–2008
 Norma Duarte (born 1998), Mexican footballer
 Óscar Duarte (disambiguation), several people
 Osmay Acosta Méndez Duarte (born 1985), Cuban amateur boxer
 Óscar Esaú Duarte Gaitán (born 1989), Costa Rican professional footballer
 Pedro Miguel Mimoso Duarte (born 1978), Portuguese footballer
 Rafael Duarte Lima (born 1983), Brazilian boxer
 Raúl Fragoso Ferreira Duarte (born 1963), Angolan basketball coach
 Raúl Ricardo Duarte Barrios (born 1969), Paraguayan footballer and current manager
 Regina Blois Duarte (born 1947), Brazilian actress
 Ricardo André Duarte Pires (born 1982), Portuguese footballer
 Robert Jack Duarte Wallace (born 1986), Mexican actor and singer
 Roberto Duarte Silva, Cape Verdian chemist
 Rui Duarte (footballer, born 1980), Portuguese professional footballer
 Rui Pedro Viegas Silva Gomes Duarte (born 1978), Portuguese professional footballer
 Sérgio de Queiroz Duarte (born 1934), Brazilian career diplomat
 Sérgio Valle Duarte, Brazilian multimedia artist and photographer
 Sophie Duarte (born 1981), French runner
 Stella Pope Duarte, Latina American novelist
 Teófilo Duarte (1898–1958), Portuguese colonial administrator
 Thaís Duarte Guedes (born 1993), Brazilian footballer
 Thomas James Duarte (born 1995), American football tight
 Valdomiro Duarte de Macedo (born 1979), Brazilian footballer
 Vera Valentina Benrós de Melo Duarte Lobo de Pina (born 1952), also known as Vera Duarte Martins, Cape Verdean human rights activist
 Vinicius Duarte (born 1996), Brazilian footballer
 John Duarte (born 1966), American politician and U.S. Representative

Fictional characters
 Jude Duarte, from Holly Black's The Folk of the Air trilogy, including The Cruel Prince
 Duarte Pinto and his son Duarte "Cory" Pinto Jr., from Meg Wolitzer's The Female Persuasion
 Duarte, chief detective in the Portuguese police comedy TV series 
 Inés Duarte, title character of the Venezuelan telenovela Inés Duarte, secretaria
 Pascual Duarte, title character of Camilo José Cela's novel The Family of Pascual Duarte
 Winston Duarte, from James S. A. Corey's novel series The Expanse

Spanish-language surnames
Portuguese-language surnames